Grand Rapids Alliance were an American soccer team, founded in 2002. The team was a member of the National Premier Soccer League (NPSL), the fourth tier of the American Soccer Pyramid, until 2006, when the team left the league and the franchise was terminated.

The club was part of the larger Alliance FC organization, which runs over 40 soccer programs for boys, girls and adults across Western Michigan.

The Alliance played their home matches at the EGR Memorial Stadium in the city of East Grand Rapids, Michigan. The team's colors were orange and white.

Year-by-year

External links
Grand Rapids Alliance

National Premier Soccer League teams
Soccer clubs in Michigan
Sports in Grand Rapids, Michigan
2002 establishments in Michigan
2006 disestablishments in Michigan
Association football clubs established in 2002
Association football clubs disestablished in 2006